Belyayevo is a station on the Kaluzhsko-Rizhskaya Line of the Moscow Metro. It opened on 12 August 1974 as part of the southwest extension of the Kaluzhsky radius

Design
It was designed by V. Polikarpova, V. Klokov, and L. Popov. The station was built on a modified version of the standard column tri-span design, with white marble columns and tiled walls decorated with metal panels depicting various folktales (artists by J. Bodniek and Kh. Rysin); the floor is revetted with grey granite.

Belyayevo has two underground vestibules, both of which are connected to pedestrian subways beneath Profsoyuznaya Street at its intersection with Miklukho-Maklay Street on Martin Luther King Square.

Location
As between 1974 and up to 1987 the station was a terminus of the Kaluzhsko-Rizhskaya Line, behind the station there are a set of reversal sidings used for nighttime stands.

Traffic
The daily passenger traffic is 59,800 people.

Gallery

Moscow Metro stations
Railway stations in Russia opened in 1974
Kaluzhsko-Rizhskaya Line
Railway stations located underground in Russia